Little Missouri may:
 Little Missouri (horse), an American Thoroughbred racehorse
 Little Missouri Falls, a sizable waterfall on the upper reaches of the Little Missouri River in southwest Arkansas, United States
 Little Missouri National Grassland, a National Grassland located in western North Dakota, United States
 Little Missouri State Park, a state park in North Dakota, United States, along the Little Missouri River

See also 
 Little Missouri River (disambiguation)
 Missouri (disambiguation)